On August 7, 2011, a mass shooting occurred in Copley Township, Summit County, Ohio, by 51-year-old Michael E. Hance. Seven people were shot dead before the gunman was shot and killed by Copley police officer Ben Campbell.

Details
Using two handguns, including a Hi-Point Model JHP .45-caliber pistol (which he bought from Sydmor's Jewelry in neighboring Barberton, Ohio  five days before) and a .357 Magnum six-shot revolver he bought from the same location in 2005, Hance opened fire at a house in the 2300 block of Goodenough Avenue. He first shot his 49-year-old girlfriend Rebecca K. Dieter, who was the only survivor in the shooting. Dieter managed to call 9-1-1 before escaping to the porch of her house and being shot again in the back, after which she pretended to be dead.

He then ran into an adjacent house, where he shot and killed Dieter's brother Craig; Autumn Johnson, 16; her grandparents, Russell Johnson, 67, and Gudrun Johnson, 64; and Amelia Shambaugh, 16, who was visiting a friend at the time and was seated in her parked car when she was shot. Hance then chased Autumn Johnson's father, 44-year-old Bryan Johnson, northward, and shot him to death in a nearby driveway on Schocalog Road.

He next followed Craig's son, 11-year-old Scott, into a house on the same street. There, Hance found Scott hiding behind a furnace in the basement with the home's current residents, Melonie Bagley and her three children (nine-year-old Dae'Shawn, three-year-old Destany, and a one-year-old daughter). Bagley tried to deny that Scott was with her before fleeing with her daughters. Hance found Scott and Dae'Shawn, shooting and killing the former while leaving the Bagley family alive.

As Hance was leaving the house, Officer Ben Campbell, along with former Copley Township policeman Keith Lavery, spotted him. Together, they issued commands, which Hance ignored, raising his gun instead, firing shots at them. In response, Campbell and Lavery shot at Hance, with rounds from Campbell's rifle ultimately killing Hance.

Perpetrator
Michael E. Hance, a 51-year-old male, was identified as the gunman in the shooting. He was described as extremely helpful, but also quiet, strange, eccentric and "not well-liked" by residents of Copley Township. Acquaintances stated that he had "compulsions" that seemed to hint at a previously un-diagnosed mental illness. He graduated from Norton High School in 1978, and was voted the "most courteous" student in the class.

In 1997, Hance contacted police about a man threatening him with a gun when he went out to confront him for vandalizing his truck. He had recently been forced to care for Dieter's father, who was suffering from dementia, and lost his job at a copy store after it was closed down. He was also having tense relations with Russell and Gudrun Johnson, who were his next-door neighbors. On one occasion, he was told by Gudrun to clean up his property, only for her to be forced away by him. He is currently survived by a sister who lives in Mogadore, Ohio.

Victims

References

2011 in Ohio
Summit County, Ohio
Deaths by firearm in Ohio
2011 murders in the United States
21st-century mass murder in the United States
Massacres in the United States
Murder in Ohio
Mass murder in 2011
2011 mass shootings in the United States
Mass shootings in the United States
Crimes in Ohio
Attacks in the United States in 2011
August 2011 crimes in the United States
Mass shootings in Ohio
Family murders